Yao Jianzhong (born 16 January 1971) is a Chinese rower. He competed in the men's eight event at the 1992 Summer Olympics.

References

1971 births
Living people
Chinese male rowers
Olympic rowers of China
Rowers at the 1992 Summer Olympics
Place of birth missing (living people)
Asian Games medalists in rowing
Rowers at the 1990 Asian Games
Asian Games gold medalists for China
Medalists at the 1990 Asian Games
20th-century Chinese people
21st-century Chinese people